Mike Pattenden is a freelance journalist and writer. He began his career in the entertainment games industry including a period at Commodore User before moving into music journalism. He was formerly Reviews Editor at VOX magazine then music correspondent at The Daily Express. He now writes about topics ranging from music to sport, entertainment and business. His work appears regularly in The Mail on Sunday, The Sunday Times and Esquire. He is also the author of Last Orders at the Liars' Bar, the official biography of The Beautiful South.

Interests
He enjoys football, cycling, snowboarding and tennis. He is a fan of West Ham United, and a former co-editor of the defunct fanzine Fortune's Always Hiding. He has also written his first novel, It's More Important Than That.

References

British male journalists
Living people
Year of birth missing (living people)